The 2009 IMSA Cooper Tires Atlantic Championship season was the thirty-sixth Atlantic Championship season. It was the first full season of the Championship under the sanctioning of the International Motor Sports Association. After a three-way title battle into the final round at Mazda Raceway Laguna Seca, John Edwards became the series' youngest champion, beating Jonathan Summerton on a tie-breaker, after both drivers finished on 182 points. They also finished tied on four victories, but Edwards broke the tie with four second-place finishes compared to Summerton's three.

Schedule

Seven rounds are held jointly with the American Le Mans Series: Sebring, Miller, Lime Rock, Mid-Ohio, Mosport, Road Atlanta and Laguna Seca.

The series planned to open its season on a road course on Hutchinson Island in Savannah, Georgia, on March 15. The race was postponed until 2010, as further work on the track was required before it could be homologated for professional open wheel racing. A second race at New Jersey Motorsports Park and Autobahn Country Club were added instead.

Drivers and teams
The following teams and drivers competed in the 2009 Atlantic Championship. All teams are using the Swift 016.a chassis powered by a Mazda-Cosworth MZR 2.3-litre inline-4 engine and Cooper tires. C2 Class teams use the Swift 014.a chassis.

Race results

Championship Standings
The point system was modified from previous years for the 2009 season. Points are awarded as follows:

 Bonus points will also be awarded for the fastest driver in a qualifying session (10 races will have two sessions), and most places gained during the race.
 This means the maximum a driver can score is 21, as a driver cannot earn the most places gained point, if they've started from pole.
 Only the driver's best eleven scores will count towards the championship.

Atlantic Class

C2 Class

 Polesitters are denoted in bold. Polesitters are determined by the fastest overall lap in qualifying, and one point is awarded at each round.
 Driver in italics has gained the most places in a round. One point is awarded at each round.

Notes
 At round one, no hard charger point was awarded in the C2 Class as no drivers changed positions over the 19-lap duration. This also occurred at rounds two, three and four, but on these occasions due to only one car taking part.

Television and other video
For the 2009 season, a new Atlantic Championship high-definition television package was announced on HDNet, which features live coverage of certain events, and replays of others.

Web video of events has also historically been available on the series website, and the series also has its own official YouTube channel under the username "AtlanticRacingSeries."

References

Atlantic Season 2009
Atlantic Championship seasons
Atlantic Championship